Concepción Velasco Varona OAXS MML (born 29 November 1939), known professionally as Concha Velasco, or Conchita Velasco in her beginnings, is a Spanish actress, singer and television presenter. She has received numerous accolades throughout her career in film, theater and television spanning over six decades, including two National Theater Awards presented by the Spanish Ministry of Culture in 1972 and 2016, the Lifetime Achievement Award presented by the Spanish Television Academy in 2009 and the Honorary Goya Award presented by the Spanish Film Academy in 2012.

Some of her credits include leading film performances in Red Cross Girls (1958), Los tramposos (1959), The Fair of the Dove (1963), Television Stories (1965), The Witching Hour (1985) and Beyond the Garden (1996); stage performances in ¡Mamá, quiero ser artista!, in several plays that author Antonio Gala wrote for her and in the Spanish productions of Filumena Marturano and Hello, Dolly!; television performances in Teresa de Jesús and Herederos on Televisión Española, Motivos personales on Telecinco and Gran Hotel on Antena 3, as well as in numerous television shows as a presenter for those three networks.

She has been also the recipient of many honors. The Government of Spain honored her with the Gold Medal of Merit in the Fine Arts in 1987, the Gold Medal of Merit in Labour in 2008 and with the Grand Cross of the Civil Order of Alfonso X, the Wise in 2016. The Spanish Film Academy honored her with its Gold Medal in 2003.

Career
Velasco was born in Valladolid in 1939. At the age of ten, she moved to Madrid where she studied classical and Spanish dance at the National Conservatory. She made her debut as a dancer in the corps de ballet of the La Coruña opera and later worked as a flamenco dancer with Manolo Caracol and as revue dancer with Celia Gámez.

She began her career in the cinema at the age of fifteen in several titles as a supporting actress. Her first films as a leading actress was Red Cross Girls (1958). During the 1960s and 1970s she combined her work starring in films and in plays for theater and television. In the film Television Stories (1965) she performed the song "Chica ye ye" composed by Augusto Algueró with lyrics by Antonio Guijarro. The song became a hit and she suddenly found success as a yé-yé singer recording eight albums.

During the 1970s and 1980s she performed more serious roles. Her most successful role for television was in Teresa de Jesús (1984) as Teresa of Ávila. Also in the 1980s she launched her career as television presenter hosting the New Year's Eve variety shows to welcome 1985, 1986 and 1987 on Televisión Española.

On 14 March 2018 she announced that, after a career of 64 years, the stage play El funeral would be her last. She retired on 21 September 2021 with her last performance of the play La habitación de María at Theatre of Bretón de los Herreros in Logroño.

Filmography

Film 

 1954: El bandido generoso
 1955: The Moorish Queen as Bailaora
 1956: La fierecilla domada
 1956: Dos novias para un torero
 1956: Los maridos no cenan en casa
 1957: Mensajeros de paz
 1957: Muchachas en vacaciones
 1958: Red Cross Girls as Paloma
 1959: El día de los enamorados as Conchita
 1959: Los tramposos as Julita
 1959: Crimen para recién casados
 1959: Vida sin risas
 1960: Amor bajo cero
 1960: Julia y el celacanto
 1960: Peace Never Comes as Paula
 1961: The Reprieve as Antonia
 1961: Trampa para Catalina
 1961: Martes y trece
 1961: My Wedding Night as Fernanda Jiménez
 1961: Festival en Benidorm as Lía / María / Estefanía
 1962: Sabían demasiado
 1963: La boda era a las doce
 1963: The Fair of the Dove as Susana / Mari Loli
 1964: Casi un caballero
 1965: Television Stories as Katy
 1965: Susana
 1965: Honeymoon, Italian Style as Rosetta de Curtis
 1965: La frontera de Dios
 1966: El arte de no casarse
 1966: Hoy como ayer
 1966: El arte de casarse
 1966: Honeymoon, Italian Style 
 1967: Pero... ¿en qué país vivimos?
 1967: Las Locas del conventillo as María
 1967: Las que tienen que servir as Juana Cortés
 1968: Una vez al año, ser hippy no hace daño
 1968: Relaciones casi públicas as Marta
 1968: Los que tocan el piano
 1969: Cuatro noches de boda
 1969: Matrimonios separados
 1969: Juicio de faldas as Marta
 1970: La decente as Nuria
 1970: Después de los nueve meses
 1970: En un lugar de La Manga
 1971: Me debes un muerto
 1971: Préstame quince días as Iris
 1972: No encontré rosas para mi madre
 1972: Venta por pisos
 1973: El amor empieza a medianoche
 1973: El Love Feroz o cuando los hijos juegan al amor
 1974: Tormento
 1974: Mi mujer es muy decente, dentro de lo que cabe as Margarita
 1975: Yo soy fulana de tal as Mapi Sánchez
 1975: Pim, pam, pum... ¡fuego!
 1975: Un lujo a su alcance
 1976: Long Vacations of 36 as Mercedes
 1976: Libertad provisional
 1977: Esposa y amante
 1978: Jaque a la dama
 1979: Cinco tenedores
 1979: Ernesto as Aunt Regina
 1982: La colmena as Purita
 1985: The Witching Hour as Pilar
 1989: Esquilache as Pastora Patermo
 1992: Yo me bajo en la próxima... ¿y usted? as Concha
 1996: Beyond the Garden as Palmira Gadea
 1996: Sombras y luces. Cien años de cine español
 1999: París-Tombuctú
 2000: Km. 0 as Marga
 2001: Sólo yo sé tu nombre
 2002: El oro de Moscú as Pastora Bernal
 2006: Welcome Home
 2007: Boystown as Antonia
 2007: Crazy as Nuria
 2009: Por la gracia de Luis
 2009: Rage as Sra. Torres

Stage

Television

As herself

Awards and nominations

Honours 
  Gold Medal of Merit in the Fine Arts (Kingdom of Spain, 30 December 1987).
 Gold Medal of the Academy of Cinematographic Arts and Sciences of Spain (4 April 2003).
  Gold Medal of Merit in Labour (Kingdom of Spain, 5 December 2008).
  Dame Grand Cross of the Civil Order of Alfonso X, the Wise (Kingdom of Spain, 7 October 2016).
 Valladolid Gold Medal (City Council of Valladolid, 17 March 2018).
 Madrid Gold Medal (City Council of Madrid, 15 May 2018).

References

External links

Spanish page about  Concha Velasco

1939 births
Living people
People from Valladolid
Actresses from Castile and León
Spanish television presenters
Spanish women singers
Spanish film actresses
Spanish stage actresses
Spanish Roman Catholics
Recipients of the Civil Order of Alfonso X, the Wise
Spanish women television presenters
20th-century Spanish actresses
21st-century Spanish actresses